The Apostolic Nunciature to the Cook Islands is an ecclesiastical office of the Catholic Church in the Cook Islands. It is a diplomatic post of the Holy See, whose representative is called the Apostolic Nuncio with the rank of an ambassador. The nuncio resides in Wellington, New Zealand; the current Nuncio is Novatus Rugambwa, since 2 February 2021.

List of papal representatives to the Cook Islands 
Apostolic Nuncios
Patrick Coveney (14 July 2001 – 25 January 2005)
Charles Daniel Balvo (25 March 2006 – 17 January 2013)
Martin Krebs (8 May 2013 – 16 June 2018)
Novatus Rugambwa (2 February 2021 – present)

References

Cook Islands